Tunisia's population was estimated to be around 12.04 million in 2022. In the generally youthful African continent, Tunisia's population is among the most mature. This is because the government has supported a successful family planning program that has reduced the population growth rate to just over 1% per annum, contributing to Tunisia's economic and social stability.

The population of Tunisia is made up of Arabs (98%), Berbers (1%), and others (1%). Around 98 percent of the population are Muslim. There is a Jewish population on the southern island of Djerba and in Tunis. There also exists a small autochthonous group of Christian adherents.

Population History

Source: National Institute of Statistics and United Nations Statistics Division

Vital statistics

Current natural growth

Structure of the population

Ethnic groups 

The majority of the population of Tunisia is made up of Arabs (98% of the population). The first people known to history in what is now Tunisia were the Berbers, who currently make up 1% of the population, and were ultimately conquered by the Arabs in the 7th century. There was a continuing inflow of nomadic Arab tribes to the Maghreb from the Arabian Peninsula since the 7th century with a major wave in the 11th century.

Whilst the Ottoman influence has been particularly significant in forming the Turco-Tunisian community, other peoples have also migrated to Tunisia during different periods of time, including Sub-Saharan Africans, Greeks, Romans, Phoenicians (Punics), Jews, and French settlers. The Tunisian, by 1870 the distinction between the Arabic-speaking mass and the Turkish elite had blurred. There is also a small Berber (1% at most) population located in the Dahar mountains and on the island of Djerba in the south-east and in the Khroumire mountainous region in the north-west.

From the late 19th century to after World War II, Tunisia was home to large populations of French and Italians (255,000 Europeans in 1956), although nearly all of them, along with the Jewish population, left after Tunisia became independent. The history of the Jews in Tunisia goes back some 2,000 years. In 1948 the Jewish population was an estimated 105,000, but by 2013 only about 900 remained.

After the Reconquista and expulsion of non-Christians and Moriscos from Spain, many Spanish Muslims and Jews also arrived. According to Matthew Carr, "As many as eighty thousand Moriscos settled in Tunisia, most of them in and around the capital, Tunis, which still contains a quarter known as Zuqaq al-Andalus, or Andalusia Alley."

Genetics

Tunisians mainly carry haplogroup J1 (34.2%) and haplogroup E (55%).

"In fact, the Tunisian genetic distances to European samples are smaller than those to North African groups. (...) This could be explained by the history of the Tunisian population, reflecting the influence of the ancient Punic settlers of Carthage followed, among others, by Roman, Byzantine, Arab and French occupations, according to historical records. Notwithstanding, other explanations cannot be discarded, such as the relative heterogeneity within current Tunisian populations, and/or the limited sub-Saharan genetic influence in this region as compared with other North African areas, without excluding the possibility of the genetic drift, whose effect might be particularly amplified on the X chromosome.",

However, later research has suggested instead that Tunisians exhibit a mostly indigenous North African ancestral component similar to other Northwest African populations; characterized by a high amount of native Northwest African genes, but with higher Middle Eastern input than in Algeria or Morocco.

Y-Chromosome
Listed here are the human Y-chromosome DNA haplogroups in Tunisia.

Other demographic statistics 
The following demographic statistics of Tunisia in 2022 are from the World Population Review.

The following demographic statistics are from the CIA World Factbook, unless otherwise indicated.

Population
11,896,972 (2022 est.)

Religions
Muslim (official; Sunni) 99%, other (includes Christian, Jewish, Shia Muslim, and Baha'i) <1%

Age structure

0-14 years: 25.28% (male 1,529,834/female 1,433,357)
15-24 years: 12.9% (male 766,331/female 745,888)
25-54 years: 42.85% (male 2,445,751/female 2,576,335)
55-64 years: 10.12% (male 587,481/female 598,140)
65 years and over: 8.86% (male 491,602/female 546,458) (2020 est.)

Birth rate
14.62 births/1,000 population (2022 est.) Country comparison to the world: 119th

Death rate
6.36 deaths/1,000 population (2022 est.) Country comparison to the world: 143rd

Total Fertility Rates
2 children born/woman (2022 est.) Country comparison to the world: 108th
 2.03 children born/woman (2021 est.)

Contraceptive prevalence rate
 50.7% (2018 est.)

Population growth rate
0.69% (2022 est.) Country comparison to the world: 129th
 0.75% (2021 est.)

Median age
total: 32.7 years. Country comparison to the world: 107th
male: 32 years
female: 33.3 years (2020 est.)

Net migration rate
-1.33 migrant(s)/1,000 population (2022 est.) Country comparison to the world: 154th
-1.34 migrant(s)/1,000 population (2021 est.)
-1.6 migrant(s)/1,000 population (2018 est.)
-0.41 migrant(s)/1,000 population (2010 est.)

Urbanization
urban population: 70.2% of total population (2022)
rate of urbanization: 1.34% annual rate of change (2020-25 est.)

Urban population: 69.9% of total population (2021)
Rate of urbanization:  1.34% annual rate of change (2020-25 est.)

Education expenditures
7.3% of GDP (2016) Country comparison to the world: 18th

Sex ratio

At birth: 1.06 male(s)/female
0-14 years: 1.07 male(s)/female
15-24 years: 1.03 male(s)/female
25-54 years: 0.95 male(s)/female
55-64 years: 0.98 male(s)/female
65 years and over: 0.9 male(s)/female
total population: 0.99 male(s)/female (2020 est.)

Infant mortality rate
Total: 12.16 deaths/1,000 live births (2021 est.)
Male: 13.67 deaths/1,000 live births
Female: 10.57 deaths/1,000 live births

Life expectancy at birth
Total population: 76.57 years (2021 est.)
Male: 74.88 years
Female: 78.36 years

Nationality
noun: Tunisian(s)
adjective: Tunisian

Ethnic groups
Arabs 98%
Berbers 1%
Jews and others 1%

Languages
Modern Standard Arabic (official, one of the languages of commerce and education)
Tunisian Arabic (local dialect of Arabic, everyday use) 
French (commerce and education)
Berber (minority language spoken by <1% of the population)

Literacy
definition:
age 15 and over can read and write
total population:
81.8%
male:
89.6%
female:
74.2% (2015 est.)

The literacy rate among the Tunisian population increased greatly after its independence from France. According to the 1996 census data, the literacy rate of the last generation of Tunisian men educated under the French rule (those born 1945–49) was less than 65%. For the first generation educated after independence (born 1950–1954), literacy in Arabic among males had increased to nearly 80%. (Sixty-two percent were also literate in French and 15 percent literate in English). Among the youngest generation included in the census (those born 1980–1984), 96.6% were literate in Arabic.

Among Tunisian women, the increase in literacy was even greater. The literacy rate among the last generation of women educated under the French was less than 30%. In the first generation educated after independence, this increased to just over 40%. For the youngest generation of women cited (born 1980–1984), literacy in Arabic had increased to slightly over 90%; over 70% of women were also literate in French.

Life expectancy

total population: 76.82 years. Country comparison to the world: 99th
male: 75.14 years
female: 78.6 years (2022 est.)

Source: UN World Population Prospects

Literacy
definition: age 15 and over can read and write
total population: 81.8%
male: 89.6%
female: 74.2% (2015)

School life expectancy (primary to tertiary education)
total: 15 years
male: 14 years
female: 16 years (2016)

Unemployment, youth ages 15-24
total: 34.9%
male: 33.8%
female: 37.2% (2017 est.)

References

 

pt:Tunísia#Demografia